Stovner is a subway station on Grorudbanen (Line 5) on the Oslo Metro, between Rommen and the end station Vestli, it was opened in 1974. The station is underground, at the entry of the tunnel. At or above the station is the large Stovner shopping centre, the Stovner police station, and a small bus terminal. Stovner is mainly a residential area.

References

External links

Oslo Metro stations in Oslo
Railway stations opened in 1974
1974 establishments in Norway